Elqui Province is a province in the Chilean region of Coquimbo (IV). The provincial capital is the city of Coquimbo.

Geography and demography
It is the ninth most populated province in the country. Between the 1992 and 2002 censuses, the population grew by 28.3% (80,613 persons).

Municipalities in the province of Elqui
Andacollo
Coquimbo
La Higuera
La Serena
Paihuano
Vicuña

Elqui Valley wine region

See also
 Elqui River

References

 

Provinces of Coquimbo Region
Provinces of Chile